Julie Marie Berman (born November 3, 1983) is an American actress. She is known for her role as Lulu Spencer on the ABC Daytime soap opera General Hospital, for which she received three Daytime Emmy Awards, and for her role on the Golden Globe nominated Hulu  comedy series Casual as Leia, Valerie's receptionist.

Early life
Berman was born to Peter and Renée Berman in Los Angeles, California. She started acting at the age of six.

Career
Berman made her television debut with the recurring role in the WB family drama series, 7th Heaven as the misunderstood Shelby Connor, a friend of Lucy Camden. Berman continued her role on 7th Heaven, while simultaneously adding a recurring role in the ABC drama Once and Again. She also guest-starred on ER and Boston Public, and starred alongside Shelley Long in the 1999 television movie Vanished Without a Trace.

2005–13; General Hospital
Berman is best known for her role as Lulu Spencer, the stubborn, troubled daughter of Luke and Laura Spencer, in the ABC daytime soap opera General Hospital. She made her first appearance on October 28, 2005. The casting immediately garnered much attention due to Berman's strong resemblance to Genie Francis who played Laura; Lulu and Laura's strong resemblance was often mentioned within the series. In July 2012, Berman informed producers that she had no plans of renewing her contract when it expired in November. Despite no official word from ABC or Berman, rumors began to circulate that Berman was about to vacate the role. After months of speculation, on February 26, 2013, an issue of Soaps In Depth confirmed that Berman was indeed leaving the series and had just filmed her final scenes.

Berman earned her first Daytime Emmy nomination in 2007, and won her first Daytime Emmy for Outstanding Younger Actress in 2009. She won her second consecutive Emmy in 2010 in the same category. Berman departed her role as Lulu in 2013, and was replaced by The Young and the Restless actress Emme Rylan In 2013, Berman won her third Emmy, but in the Daytime Emmy Award for Outstanding Supporting Actress category.

2013–present 
After leaving daytime television, Berman guest-starred on prime time comedy series include Two and a Half Men and Jane the Virgin. In 2015, she began the recurring role opposite Michaela Watkins and Frances Conroy in the Hulu comedy series, Casual. She was promoted to series regular for second season. Later that year, Berman joined the cast of NBC medical drama Chicago Med, playing the recurring role of Dr. Samantha "Sam" Zanetti.

Personal life
Berman graduated with a bachelor's degree in Television and Cinema from the University of Southern California in May 2006. While at the university she was a member of the Kappa Kappa Gamma sorority.

Berman married Michael Grady on August 15, 2008. The couple welcomed their first child, son Asher Dean Grady on February 18, 2019. Their second child, son Holden Jeffrey Grady was born on January 21, 2022

Filmography

Film

Television

Awards and nominations

References

External links
 
 

1983 births
Living people
American soap opera actresses
Jewish American actresses
Actresses from Los Angeles
USC School of Cinematic Arts alumni
Daytime Emmy Award winners
Daytime Emmy Award for Outstanding Supporting Actress in a Drama Series winners
Daytime Emmy Award for Outstanding Younger Actress in a Drama Series winners
20th-century American actresses
21st-century American actresses
20th-century American Jews
21st-century American Jews
American television actresses